Karel Nováček was the defending champion, but lost in the first round this year.

Francisco Clavet won the tournament, beating Eduardo Masso in the final, 3–6, 6–4, 6–2, 6–0.

Seeds

Draw

Finals

Top half

Bottom half

External links
 ATP main draw

Dutch Open (tennis)
Dutch Open
1990 Dutch Open (tennis)